is a railway station on the Banetsu West Line in the town of Bandai, Fukushima Japan, operated by East Japan Railway Company (JR East).

Lines

Station layout
Bandaimachi Station has a single island platform connected to the station building by a level crossing. The station is staffed.

Platforms

History
It was renamed Bandaimachi on June 1, 1965. The station was absorbed into the JR East network upon the privatization of the Japanese National Railways (JNR) on April 1, 1987.

Passenger statistics
In fiscal 2017, the station was used by an average of 156 passengers daily (boarding passengers only).

Surrounding area
 Site of Enichi-ji (National Historic Site)
 Bandaimachi Town Hall
 Bandaimachi Post Office

See also
 List of railway stations in Japan

References

External links

 JR East station information 

Railway stations in Fukushima Prefecture
Ban'etsu West Line
Railway stations in Japan opened in 1899
Bandai, Fukushima